Bill Smith (March 14, 1934 – February 28, 1996) was a professional poker player who won the 1985 World Series of Poker Main Event.

Poker career
Smith was a staple at the World Series of Poker during the 1980s.  He was involved in three final tables of the Main Event.  At the 1981 and 1986 WSOP Smith placed fifth, but at the 1985 World Series of Poker he won the bracelet, and $700,000.  His total tournament winnings exceeded $1,050,000. His three cashes at the WSOP accounted for $788,800 of his lifetime winnings.

Smith would often play professional poker tournaments drunk. By all accounts, he was an alcoholic.

According to fellow poker player T. J. Cloutier, Smith did not play well when he was sober or totally drunk. “Bill was the tightest player you'd ever played in your life when he was sober. And when he was halfway drunk, he was the best player I'd ever played with. No one could read opponents’ hands better than half- drunk Smith. But when he got past that halfway mark, he was the worst player I'd ever played with.” 

The year Smith won the Main Event, he entered the final day's play sober and just sat there while he warmed up. After he started drinking, he accumulated a huge pile of chips by well-timed aggressive play. He had so many chips once he was totally drunk that good luck led him to victory.

World Series of Poker Bracelets

Death
Smith died in 1996.

References

1996 deaths
American poker players
World Series of Poker bracelet winners
World Series of Poker Main Event winners
Super Bowl of Poker event winners
1934 births